Wloclawker Weker was a Yiddish-language weekly newspaper in interbellum Poland, published from Włocławek. Wloclawker Weker was an organ of the General Jewish Labour Bund in Poland.

References

General Jewish Labour Bund in Poland
Yiddish socialist newspapers
Defunct newspapers published in Poland
Yiddish-language mass media in Poland
Mass media in Włocławek
Weekly newspapers published in Poland